Kenny MacDonald (born 9 March 1961) is a Scottish former professional footballer who played as a forward.

Career
Born in Dundee, MacDonald played for Broughty Athletic, St Johnstone, Forfar Athletic, Happy Valley, Airdrie, Raith Rovers, Arbroath, Stirling Albion, East Stirlingshire, Cowdenbeath and Dundee St. Josephs.

References

1961 births
Living people
Scottish footballers
Broughty Athletic F.C. players
St Johnstone F.C. players
Forfar Athletic F.C. players
Airdrieonians F.C. (1878) players
Raith Rovers F.C. players
Arbroath F.C. players
Stirling Albion F.C. players
East Stirlingshire F.C. players
Cowdenbeath F.C. players
Scottish Football League players
Association football forwards
Scottish expatriate footballers
Scottish expatriate sportspeople in Hong Kong
Expatriate footballers in Hong Kong
Happy Valley AA players
Footballers from Dundee